Gammacerane is a pentacyclic triterpene compound with the formula C30H52 and five six-membered rings. Its derivatives include tetrahymanol（Gammaceran-3β-ol）and so on. After millions of years of diagenesis, these derivatives became gammacerane can be used as biomarkers in petroleum to study the origin of petroleum.

See also
 
 Hopane and

References

Triterpenes